Komsomolsky is an urban locality (a work settlement) in Chamzinsky District of the Republic of Mordovia, Russia. As of the 2010 Census, its population was 13,513.

Administrative and municipal status
Within the framework of administrative divisions, the work settlement of Komsomolsky is incorporated within Chamzinsky District as Komsomolsky Work Settlement (an administrative division of the district). As a municipal division, Komsomolsky Work Settlement is incorporated within Chamzinsky Municipal District as Komsomolskoye Urban Settlement.

References

Notes

Sources

Urban-type settlements in Mordovia
Chamzinsky District

